Berlin Papyrus may refer to several papyri kept in the Egyptian Museum of Berlin, including:

 Berlin Papyrus 3033 or the Westcar Papyrus, a storytelling papyrus
 Berlin Papyrus 3038 or the Brugsch Papyrus, a medical papyrus
 Berlin Papyrus 6619, a mathematical papyrus
 Papyrus Berlin 17213, a Koine Greek fragment of the Septuagint, dated to the 3rd century CE